Václavíček (feminine Václavíčková) is a Czech surname. Notable people with the surname include:

 Rostislav Václavíček (born 1946), Czech footballer
 Václav Vilém Václavíček (1788–1862), Czech Catholic priest and theological writer

Czech-language surnames
Patronymic surnames
Surnames from given names